Gherghești is a commune in Vaslui County, Western Moldavia, Romania. It is composed of nine villages: Chetrosu, Corodești, Dragomănești, Drăxeni, Gherghești, Lazu, Lunca, Soci and Valea Lupului.

References

Communes in Vaslui County
Localities in Western Moldavia